Stonyford (formerly, Stony Ford) is a census-designated place in Colusa County, California. It lies at an elevation of 1184 feet (361 m).  Its zip code is 95979 and its area code is 530. Stonyford's population was 149 at the 2010 census.

Demographics
The 2010 United States Census reported that Stonyford had a population of 149. The racial makeup of Stonyford was 127 (85.2%) White, 0 (0.0%) African American, 4 (2.7%) Native American, 0 (0.0%) Asian, 1 (0.7%) Pacific Islander, 12 (8.1%) from other races, and 5 (3.4%) from two or more races. Hispanic or Latino of any race were 22 persons (14.8%).

The Census reported that 149 people (100% of the population) lived in households, 0 (0%) lived in non-institutionalized group quarters, and 0 (0%) were institutionalized.

There were 69 households, out of which 15 (21.7%) had children under the age of 18 living in them, 33 (47.8%) were heterosexual married couples living together, 10 (14.5%) had a female householder with no husband present, 4 (5.8%) had a male householder with no wife present.  There were 4 (5.8%) unmarried heterosexual partnerships, and 1 (1.4%) homosexual married couples or partnerships. 17 households (24.6%) were made up of individuals, and 5 (7.2%) had someone living alone who was 65 years of age or older. The average household size was 2.16.  There were 47 families (68.1% of all households); the average family size was 2.51.

The population was spread out, with 25 people (16.8%) under the age of 18, 8 people (5.4%) aged 18 to 24, 22 people (14.8%) aged 25 to 44, 62 people (41.6%) aged 45 to 64, and 32 people (21.5%) who were 65 years of age or older.  The median age was 50.4 years. For every 100 females, there were 93.5 males.  For every 100 females age 18 and over, there were 93.8 males.

The homeowner vacancy rate was 2.1%; the rental vacancy rate was 4.3%.  97 people (65.1% of the population) lived in owner-occupied housing units and 52 people (34.9%) lived in rental housing units.

Politics

Climate
This region experiences hot and dry summers, with average monthly temperatures above 71.6 °F.  According to the Köppen Climate Classification system, Stonyford has a warm-summer Mediterranean climate, abbreviated "Csb" on climate maps.

References

Census-designated places in Colusa County, California
Census-designated places in California